This is a list of U.S. states, the District of Columbia and territories by infant and under-five mortality rates in 2017. The infant mortality rate is the number of deaths of infants under one year old per 1,000 live births. This rate is often used as an indicator of the level of health in a country. The child mortality rate is the number of deaths of infants and children under five years old per 100,000 live births.

List by infant mortality rate 
US States by infant mortality in 2017 according to the Centers for Disease Control and Prevention.

References 

infant mortality rates
infant mortality rates
Ranked lists of country subdivisions
United States demography-related lists